Mount Joy is a borough in Lancaster County, Pennsylvania, United States. The population was 8,346 at the 2020 census, and an estimated 8,323 in 2021.

Name and origin
The name is often shortened to "Mt Joy", as in Mencken (1963). However, citizens of the town often point out that this abbreviation is not proper because the town is not named for a mountain but is named after the "Good Ship" Mountjoy which famously broke a Catholic siege during the Siege of Derry. Due to the early settlement of the Protestant Scots-Irish in this region of Pennsylvania, many of the municipalities in the area were given names common to the North of Ireland, such as Derry Township, Londonderry Township, South Londonderry Township, Mount Joy Township, East Donegal Township, West Donegal Township, and Rapho Township.

Mount Joy is often named in lists of "delightfully-named towns" in Pennsylvania Dutch Country, along with Intercourse, Blue Ball, Lititz, Bareville, Bird-in-Hand and Paradise.

General information
ZIP code: 17552
Area code: 717
Local phone codes: 492, 653, 928

Geography
Mount Joy is located in northwestern Lancaster County at  (40.109895, -76.510977). Pennsylvania Route 230 passes through the center of town as Main Street, leading southeast  to Lancaster, the county seat, and northwest  to Elizabethtown. PA-772 crosses PA-230 west of the borough center and leads northeast  to Manheim and southwest  to Marietta on the Susquehanna River.

Little Chiques Creek, a south-flowing tributary of Chiques Creek and part of the Susquehanna River watershed, crosses the eastern side of the borough.

In the 1970s, Mount Joy was chosen as the site of one of ten Decision Information Distribution System radio stations, designed to alert the public of an enemy attack. The system was never implemented and the station was not built.

Demographics

The 2010 United States Census reports the following demographics for Mount Joy Borough:
 Total population: 7,410
 Male: 3,624
 Female: 3,786
 Hispanic or Latino: 549
 White: 6,809
 African American: 187
 Asian: 58
 American Indian and Alaska Native: 20
 Identified by two or more: 170

Museums and historic sites
Bube's Brewery and Central Hotel
Donegal Mills Plantation
George Brown's Sons Cotton and Woolen Mill
Nissly Swiss Chocolate Company

Notable people
 Kaufman Thuma "K.T." Keller, president and CEO, Chrysler Corporation
 Joseph F. Knipe, brigadier general, 46th PA Infantry, during the American Civil War
 Donald Kraybill, researcher and author on Anabaptist groups
 Clarence Charles Newcomer (1923–2005), United States federal judge
 Winfred Trexler Root, historian
 Mike Sarbaugh, coach, Cleveland Guardians
 Bruce Sutter, Major League Baseball pitcher and National Baseball Hall of Fame and Museum inductee
 Clarence Stoll, president, Western Electric Company

Notes

References
 Anderson, William Charles (1979) Home Sweet Home Has Wheels: Or, Please Don't Tailgate the Real Estate
 
 Museums Association (2006) The Museums journal, Volume 106, Issues 1-6, Indexes to papers read before the Museums Association, 1890–1909. Compiled by Charles Madeley.
 Rand McNally and Company (1978) Vacation & Travel Guide
 Ward's Quarterly, Volume 1, 1965

External links

 

Populated places established in 1812
Boroughs in Lancaster County, Pennsylvania
1812 establishments in Pennsylvania